Princess Charlotte, Duchess of Valentinois (Charlotte Louise Juliette Grimaldi; 30 September 1898 – 16 November 1977), was the daughter of Louis II, Prince of Monaco, and the mother of Prince Rainier III. From 1922 until 1944, she was the Hereditary Princess of Monaco, heiress presumptive to the throne.

Birth and adoption

Born Charlotte Louise Juliette de Monaco in Constantine, French Algeria, she was the illegitimate daughter of Marie Juliette Louvet, a cabaret singer, and Louis, Hereditary Prince of Monaco and Duke of Valentinois, son and heir of Monaco's reigning monarch, Prince Albert I. Louis had no legitimate children or siblings, so even before he succeeded his father as Prince Louis II, the principality sought to forestall a succession crisis, anticipating that its neighbour, the French Republic, might take it amiss if the throne fell someday to Louis' legal next of kin. That heir was his cousin, Wilhelm, 2nd Duke of Urach, who, although born and raised in Monte Carlo as the son of Princess Florestine of Monaco, was a German subject, property owner and patrilineal relative of the kings of Württemberg. On 15 May 1911, a law was passed recognising Charlotte as Louis' daughter, and declaring her to be a dynastic member of the sovereign family. Though this act was later held to be invalid under the 1882 statutes, an Ordinance of 30 October 1918 was passed to allow her to be adopted into the dynasty instead. Louis adopted Charlotte in Paris on 16 May 1919, thereby entitling her to the surname Grimaldi, while her grandfather bestowed upon her the traditional title of the Principality's heir, Duchess of Valentinois, for life. Charlotte became heir presumptive to the throne as Hereditary Princess when her grandfather died and her father inherited the princely crown in 1922.

Legality of adoption
A shadow of doubt existed over the legality of this adoption. The Monegasque Civil Code (Articles 240 and 243) required that the adopting party be at least of age 50 and the adoptee 21. The 1918 Ordinance changed the age limit to 18 (Charlotte was twenty at the time) but not the other age limit; Louis was then only 48.

Marriage
In Monaco, civilly on 18 March and religiously on 19 March 1920, Louis arranged Charlotte's marriage to the then Count Pierre de Polignac of Hennebont, Morbihan, Brittany, France, who, by the Prince's ordinance, took the surname Grimaldi and became a prince of the Monegasque princely family. The couple had two children:

 Princess Antoinette Louise Alberte Suzanne (28 December 1920 – 18 March 2011).
 Rainier III, Prince of Monaco (31 May 1923 – 6 April 2005).

Their marriage was not, however, a happy one; they separated on 20 March 1930 due to his homosexuality, and Charlotte left him to live with her doctor and Italian lover, Dalmazzo. The couple were divorced on 18 February 1933 by ordinance of Prince Louis II.

Late life
On 30 May 1944, the day before her son's 21st birthday and in full agreement with her father, Charlotte renounced and ceded her rights to the throne to her son Rainier, subject to the stipulation that he not predecease her. From this date, she was no longer Hereditary Princess of Monaco, though she retained the title Princess Charlotte of Monaco.

Late in life she went to college, obtaining a degree in social work. After her son assumed the throne (in 1949), Princess Charlotte moved to live at Château de Marchais, the Grimaldi estate outside Paris. Despite the objections of her children who feared for her safety, she turned the estate into a rehabilitation centre for ex-convicts. She lived at the estate with her lover, a noted French former jewel thief named René Girier and nicknamed "René la Canne" (René the Cane).

She died in 1977 in Paris.

Titles and styles
 30 September 1898 – 18 July 1911: Charlotte Louise Juliette de Monaco
 18 July 1911 – 15 November 1911: Charlotte Louise Juliette Grimaldi de Monaco
 15 November 1911 – 16 May 1919: Charlotte Louise Juliette Grimaldi de Monaco, Mademoiselle de Valentinois
 16 May 1919 – 1 August 1922: Her Serene Highness The Duchess of Valentinois
 1 August 1922 – 30 May 1944: Her Serene Highness The Hereditary Princess of Monaco
 30 May 1944 – 15 November 1977: Her Serene Highness Princess Charlotte of Monaco

References

|-

1898 births
1977 deaths
House of Grimaldi
Monegasque princesses
People from Constantine, Algeria
Dukes of Valentinois
Duchesses of Valentinois
Hereditary Princesses of Monaco
Illegitimate children of Monegasque monarchs
Grand Crosses of the Order of Saint-Charles
Knights Grand Cross of the Order of Grimaldi
Commanders of the Order of Cultural Merit (Monaco)
Grand Officiers of the Légion d'honneur
Polignac family
Monegasque people of German descent
Monegasque people of English descent
Monegasque people of Scottish descent
Monegasque people of Italian descent
People of Ligurian descent
Daughters of monarchs
Non-inheriting heirs presumptive